Kingston School District was a school district headquartered in Kingston, a community in unincorporated Madison County, Arkansas.

Its school was Kingston Public School/Kingston School, divided into Kingston Elementary School and Kingston High School.

History
In 1980 the Newton County School District dissolved, with a portion going to the Kingston district.

On July 1, 2004, the Kingston district, along with the Oark School District, merged into the Jasper School District. Kingston could have consolidated with the Clarksville School District and Huntsville School District, which were geographically closer, but the district administration instead chose to consolidate with the Jasper district.

References

Further reading
These include maps of predecessor districts:
 (Download)
 (Download)

External links
 

Education in Madison County, Arkansas
Defunct school districts in Arkansas
2004 disestablishments in Arkansas
School districts disestablished in 2004